Tilehurst Water Tower, is a distinctive water tower in Tilehurst, a suburb of the English town of Reading. People from Reading know they are near home when they are coming eastbound along the M4 and they can see the top of the tower. Although in recent years with the growth of trees this has become more difficult.   It is a prominent landmark in the vicinity and, located on the Tilehurst ridge line, can be seen from a considerable distance, especially when approaching Reading from the west along the M4 motorway.

The tower was erected by Reading Borough Council in 1932, in order to supplement the existing Bath Road Reservoir and supply water to properties at a higher level than the earlier water tower there. Today the tower belongs to Thames Water, and is still in use for its original purpose. It also houses the transmitter for The Breeze, a local radio station.

In November 2018 the tower was illuminated in poppy red to mark 100 years since the end of the First World War. The tower remained illuminated, and visible at night from a wide area, until Remembrance Day on 11 November.

References

External links

Buildings and structures in Reading, Berkshire
Infrastructure completed in 1932
Towers completed in 1932
Thames Water reservoirs
Water towers in the United Kingdom
Tilehurst
Reservoirs in Berkshire